Prostatectomy (from the Greek  , "prostate" and  , "excision") as a medical term refers to the surgical removal of all or part of the prostate gland. This operation is done for benign conditions that cause urinary retention, as well as for prostate cancer and for other cancers of the pelvis.

There are two main types of prostatectomies. A simple prostatectomy (also known as a subtotal prostatectomy) involves the removal of only part of the prostate. Surgeons typically carry out simple prostatectomies only for benign conditions. A radical prostatectomy, the removal of the entire prostate gland, the seminal vesicles and the vas deferens, is performed for cancer.

There are multiple ways the operation can be done: with open surgery (via a large incision through the lower abdomen), laparoscopically with the help of a robot (a type of minimally invasive surgery), through the urethra or through the perineum.

Other terms that can be used to describe a prostatectomy include:           
 Nerve-sparing: the blood vessels and nerves that promote penile erections are left behind in the body and not taken out with the prostate.          
 Limited pelvic lymph node dissection: the lymph nodes surrounding and close to the prostate are taken out (typically the area defined by external iliac vein anteriorly, the obturator nerve posteriorly, the origin of the internal iliac artery proximally, Cooper's ligament distally, the bladder medially and the pelvic side wall laterally).            
 Extended pelvic lymph node dissection (PLND): lymph nodes farther away from the prostate are taken out also (typically the area defined in a limited PLND with the posterior boundary as the floor of the pelvis).

Medical uses

Benign
Indications for removal of the prostate in a benign setting include acute urinary retention, recurrent urinary tract infections, uncontrollable hematuria, bladder stones secondary to bladder outlet obstruction, significant symptoms from bladder outlet obstruction that are refractory to medical or minimally invasive therapy, and chronic kidney disease secondary to chronic bladder outlet obstruction.

Malignant
A radical prostatectomy is performed due to malignant cancer. For prostate cancer, the best treatment often depends on the risk level presented by the disease. For most prostate cancers classified as 'very low risk' and 'low risk,' radical prostatectomy is one of several treatment options; others include radiation, watchful waiting, and active surveillance. For intermediate and high risk prostate cancers, radical prostatectomy is often recommended in addition to other treatment options. Radical prostatectomy is not recommended in the setting of known metastases when the cancer has spread through the prostate, to the lymph nodes or other parts of the body. Prior to decision making about the best treatment option for higher risk cancers, imaging studies using CT, MRI or bone scans are done to make sure the cancer has not spread outside of the prostate.

Contraindications
These would be same as the contraindications for any other surgery.

Techniques and approaches

There are several ways a prostatectomy can be done:

Open
In an open prostatectomy, the prostate is accessed through a large single incision through either the lower abdomen or the perineum. Further descriptive terms describe how the prostate is accessed anatomically through this incision (retropubic vs. suprapubic vs. perineal). A retropubic prostatectomy describes a procedure that accesses the prostate by going through the lower abdomen and behind the pubic bone. A suprapubic prostatectomy describes a procedure cuts through the lower abdomen and through the bladder to access the prostate. A perineal prostatectomy is done by making an incision between the rectum and scrotum on the underside of the abdomen.

Minimally invasive
Robotic-assisted instruments are inserted through several small abdominal incisions and controlled by a surgeon. Some use the term 'robotic' for short, in place of the term 'computer-assisted'. However, procedures performed with a computer-assisted device are performed by a surgeon, not a robot. The computer-assisted device gives the surgeon more dexterity and better vision, but no tactile feedback compared to conventional laparoscopy.  When performed by a surgeon who is specifically trained and well experienced in computer-assisted laparoscopy (CALP), there can be similar advantages over open prostatectomy, including smaller incisions, less pain, less bleeding, less risk of infection, faster healing time, and shorter hospital stay. The cost of this procedure is higher, while long-term functional and oncological superiority have yet to be established.

Risks and complications
Complications that occur in the period right after any surgical procedure, including a prostatectomy, include a risk of bleeding, a risk of infection at the site of incision or throughout the whole body, a risk of a blood clot occurring in the leg or lung, a risk of a heart attack or stroke, and a risk of death.

Severe irritation takes place if a latex catheter is inserted in the urinary tract of a person allergic to latex. That is especially severe in case of a radical prostatectomy due to the open wound there and the exposure lasting e.g. two weeks. Intense pain may indicate such situation.

Men can experience changes in their sexual responses after radical prostatectomy, including impairments to sexual desire, penile morphology and orgasmic function. A 2005 article in the medical journal Reviews in Urology listed the incidence of several complications following radical prostatectomy: mortality <0.3%, impotence >50%, ejaculatory dysfunction 100%, orgasmic dysfunction 50%, incontinence <5–30%, pulmonary embolism <1%, rectal injury <1%, urethral stricture <5%, and transfusion 20%.

Erectile dysfunction
Surgical removal of the prostate contains an increased likelihood that patients will experience erectile dysfunction. Radical prostatectomy is associated with greater decrease in sexual function than external beam radiotherapy. Nerve-sparing surgery reduces the risk that patients will experience erectile dysfunction. However, the experience and the skill of the nerve-sparing surgeon, as well as any surgeon are critical determinants of the likelihood of positive erectile function of the patient.

Following a prostatectomy, patients will not be able to ejaculate semen due to the nature of the procedure, resulting in the permanent necessity of assisted reproductive techniques in case of desires of future fertility. Preservation of normal ejaculation is possible after TUR prostatectomy, open or laser enucleation of adenoma and laser vaporisation of prostate. However, retrograde ejaculation is a common problem. Preservation of ejaculation is the aim of some new techniques.  Once the prostate and vesicles are removed, even if partial erection is achieved, ejaculation is a very different experience, with little of the compulsive release that is common to ejaculation with those organs intact.

Urinary incontinence 
Prostatectomy patients have an increased risk of leaking small amounts of urine immediately after surgery, and for the long-term, often requiring urinary incontinence devices such as condom catheters or diaper pads. A large analysis of the incidence of urinary incontinence found that 12 months after surgery, 75% of patients needed no pad, while 9–16% did. Factors associated with increased risk of long-term urinary incontinence include older age, higher BMI, more comorbidities, larger prostates surgically excised, as well as experience and technique of the surgeon.

Surgical management options for urinary incontinence secondary to prostatectomy include implantation of perineal slings and artificial urinary sphincters. Although there are limited data on the long-term outcomes in males, perineal slings are offered for mild-to-moderate post-prostatectomy incontinence. In a retrospective study the success rate of perineal sling placement in urinary incontinence following prostatectomy achieved 86% at a median follow-up of 22 months. Artificial urinary sphincters are offered for moderate-to-severe urinary incontinence in males and have shown good long-term efficacy and safety. The use of artificial urinary sphincters for post-prostatectomy incontinence is supported by the recommendations of European Association of Urology and International Consultation on Incontinence.

Transurethral injection of bulking agents have little role in the management of post-prostatectomy incontinence and there is weak evidence that these agents can offer any improvement. Pelvic floor muscle training can speed recovery of urinary incontinence following prostatectomy.

Remedies to post-operative sexual dysfunction
Very few surgeons will claim that patients return to the erectile experience they had prior to surgery.  The rates of erectile recovery that surgeons often cite are qualified by the addition of sildenafil to the recovery regimen.

Remedies to the problem of post-operative sexual dysfunction include:
 Medications
 Intraurethral suppositories
 Penile injections
 Vacuum devices
 Penile implants

Epidemiology
The use of radical prostatectomy as treatment for prostate cancer increased significantly from 1980 to 1990. As of 2000, the median age of men undergoing radical prostatectomy for localized prostate cancer was 62.

Though a very common procedure, the experience level of the surgeon performing the operation is important in determining the outcomes, rate of complications, and side effects. The more prostatectomies performed by a surgeon, the better the outcomes. This is true for prostatectomies done as open procedures and those done using minimally invasive techniques.

History

William Belfield, MD is generally credited for performing the first intentional prostatectomy via the suprapubic route in 1885, 1886 or 1887 at Cook County Hospital in Chicago. Hugh H. Young MD in collaboration with William Stewart Halsted MD developed the open, radical and perineal prostatectomies in 1904 at Johns Hopkins Brady Urological Institute, the first version of the procedure that became generally feasible. The Irish surgeon Terence Millin, MD (1903–1980) developed the radical retropubic prostatectomy in 1945. American urologist Patrick C. Walsh, MD (1938—present) developed the modern nerve-sparing, retropubic prostatectomy with minimal blood loss. The first laparoscopic prostatectomy was performed in 1991 by William Schuessler, MD and colleagues in Texas.

Costs

A 2014 survey of prostatectomy fees for uninsured patients at 70 United States hospitals found an average facility fee of $34,720 and average surgeon and anesthesiologist fees of $8,280.

See also 
 List of surgeries by type

References

External links
 The Basics of the Prostatectomy Procedure Explained
 Prostatectomy – slideshow by The New York Times

Surgical oncology
Surgical removal procedures
Male genital surgery
Prostatic procedures